Benjamin Guy Davis  (born 8 August 1970) is Professor of Chemical biology in the Department of Pharmacology and a member of the Faculty (by courtesy) in the Department of Chemistry at the University of Oxford and a Fellow of Pembroke College, Oxford. He holds the role of Science Director for Next Generation Chemistry (2019-2024) at the Rosalind Franklin Institute.

Education
He was a student of Keble College, Oxford.

Research and career
In 1998 he returned to the United Kingdom to take up a lectureship at Durham University. In the autumn of 2001 he moved to the Dyson Perrins Laboratory in the Department of Chemistry and received a fellowship at Pembroke College, Oxford. He was promoted to Professor of Chemistry in 2005. In 2021 in a new partnership between the Rosalind Franklin Institiute and the University of Oxford he took up a joint position between Medical Sciences in the Department of Pharmacology and the role of Science Director for Next Generation Chemistry; this post lasts until 2024.

His group's research centres on the chemical understanding and exploitation of biomolecular function (Synthetic Biology, Chemical Biology and Chemical Medicine), with an emphasis on carbohydrates and proteins. In particular, the group's interests encompass synthesis and methodology; target biomolecule synthesis; inhibitor/probe/substrate design; biocatalysis; enzyme and biomolecule mechanism; biosynthetic pathway determination; protein engineering; drug delivery; molecular biology; structural biology; cell biology; glycobiology; molecular imaging and in vivo biology.

Research in the Davis laboratory has been funded by the Engineering and Physical Sciences Research Council, the Biotechnology and Biological Sciences Research Council, the Medical Research Council, UCB-Celltech, AstraZeneca, the European Union, GlaxoSmithKline, Cancer Research UK, the Wellcome Trust and the Royal Society. He has supervised numerous postdoctoral researchers and doctoral students to completion.

Awards and honours
Davis was elected a Fellow of the Royal Society in 2015. His certificate of election reads: 

In 2017, he was elected a Member of the Academia Europea and in 2019, he was elected a Fellow of the Academy of Medical Sciences.

He was also a recipient of the Mullard Award from the Royal Society in 2005, the Philip Leverhulme Prize in 2002 and the Meldola Medal and Prize in 1999 from the Royal Society of Chemistry. He won the Whistler Award of the International Carbohydrate Organization in 2016. He also received the Davy Medal ("awarded for outstanding contributions in the field of chemistry") from the Royal Society in 2020.

References

Living people
Fellows of the Royal Society
Fellows of the Academy of Medical Sciences (United Kingdom)
1970 births
Alumni of the University of Oxford
Academics of the University of Oxford
People educated at Nottingham High School
Fellows of Pembroke College, Oxford
Academics of Durham University